Scott Hill (born 30 May 1977) is an Australian former professional rugby league footballer who played in the 1990s and 2000s. He was previously with the Harlequins RL club in the Super League. Hill previously played in Australia for the Melbourne Storm, Hunter Mariners (one of only two players to play in all the club's games in their lone season) and the Canterbury-Bankstown Bulldogs. Hill is a former New South Wales and Australian representative player.

Playing career
Hill made his first grade debut for Canterbury-Bankstown against South Sydney in round 18 of the 1996 ARL season scoring two tries in a 28-4 victory at the Sydney Football Stadium.  He then joined the Hunter Mariners for the Super League season in 1997.  Hill scored a try in the Hunter Mariners final ever match in round 18 1997 against Cronulla-Sutherland at the Topper Stadium.

Recruited by Melbourne from the Hunter Mariners, Hill was among several Melbourne Storm players from the club's inaugural year: 1998. He missed Melbourne's 1999 NRL grand final win over the St. George Illawarra Dragons due to a knee reconstruction.

Leaving at the end of that season, Hill moved to London to play for the Harlequins club of Super League.

References

External links

Quins profile
Bulldogs profile

1977 births
Living people
Australia national rugby league team players
Australian rugby league players
Canterbury-Bankstown Bulldogs players
Country New South Wales Origin rugby league team players
Hunter Mariners players
London Broncos players
Melbourne Storm players
New South Wales Rugby League State of Origin players
Rugby league five-eighths
Rugby league players from Dubbo